Llannerch-y-medd, is a small village, community and post town on the Isle of Anglesey in Wales.  The Royal Mail postcode is LL71, and it has a population of 1,360,<ref name="census2001">[http://www.neighbourhood.statistics.gov.uk/dissemination/viewFullDataset.do?instanceSelection=03070&productId=779&$ph=60_61&datasetInstanceId=3070&startColumn=1&numberOfColumns=8&containerAreaId=790559 Office for National Statistics : Census 2011 : Parish Headcounts : Isle of Anglesey]</ref> of whom more than 70% is Welsh speaking.

The village is situated near the centre of Anglesey close to the large water supply reservoir, Llyn Alaw, and is believed to have an ancient foundation. Llannerch means "a woodland clearing". The word medd in the name is Welsh for mead, which is made from honey, and the name may be related to the production of honey for mead. The disused Anglesey Central Railway runs through the village. Its station, opened in 1866, was closed in 1964 as part of the Beeching Axe, and its goods yard is now a car park. There is now a cafe and tea rooms housed in a modern extension of the old buildings.

Just to the northeast of the village is the hill called Pen y Foel which is 123m above sea level; between 1951 and 1956 this was the site of a VHF Fixer station, part of the RAF Western Sector, and was one of a number similar fixed sites managed by RAF Longley Lane near Preston in Lancashire. The site contained an octagonal wooden hut with a hand-steerable radio mast with two radio receivers of type R1392D, transmitter and telephone line. This hut was protected by a close surrounding octagonal brick wall to provide some bomb blast protection which still exists. The station was used to allow each sector to locate RAF or allied aircraft and to help pilots find airfields in low cloud weather conditions. Also on the hill was a rectangular brick hut (now unroofed) also built by the RAF; this was a simple two-room hut with a rainwater collection tank.  The site had three RAF wireless personnel (two were normally on duty) who were billeted with a landlady in Llannerch-y-Medd and attached to nearby RAF Valley. The site closed in around 1956 as the technology was replaced by improved systems.

The hill Pen y Foel is also the basis for the name of the local Male Voice Choir Cor Meibion Y Foel which is a member of the National Association of Choirs. It has 43 members and rehearses in the village at Capel Ifan. Over the past decade the Choir has supported local Eisteddfodau, competed in the Anglesey Eisteddfod, raised money for numerous charities and has entertained audiences in concerts, weddings and other functions throughout North Wales.

A claim that Mary, the mother of Jesus, is buried in the village forms the subject of Graham Phillips's The Marian Conspiracy''. Mary's traditional burial place is near Ephesus, in present-day Turkey.

Notable people 
 Hugh Hughes (1693–1776) a Welsh poet; lived on his estate at Llwydiarth Esgob, near Llanerchymedd,

Governance
An electoral ward exists in the same name. This ward stretches to cover the Community of Tref Alaw with a total population taken at the 2011 census of 1,941.

References

External links